Monumento station is an elevated Manila Light Rail Transit (LRT) station situated on Line 1. The station serves the southern portion of Caloocan, and is named after the most famous landmark of Caloocan, the Monumento Circle, which houses the Bonifacio Monument, a famous monument to Andrés Bonifacio. The name Monumento itself is derived from the Spanish word for monument. Being a former northern terminus of Line 1, it is called Monumento Terminal.

Monumento is located on Rizal Avenue in Grace Park West & Grace Park East, Caloocan. It is the third station for trains headed to Baclaran, the eighteenth station for trains headed to Roosevelt, and is one of the two Line 1 stations serving the city of Caloocan, the other being 5th Avenue.

LRTA has modified two tracks at Monumento leading to Balintawak, Roosevelt, and North Avenue stations.

It underwent renovations in September 2017 and was relaunched on February 14, 2018, as Yamaha Monumento station as Light Rail Manila Corporation entered into a naming rights deal with Yamaha Motor Philippines.

Transportation and building links
The station serves as a terminal and transfer point for several bus and jeepney routes serving the cities of Manila, Caloocan, Malabon, Navotas, and Valenzuela via Rizal Avenue Extension, Samson Road, and MacArthur Highway. Major provincial bus companies also have their own terminals right outside the station like Victory Liner, First North Luzon Transit, and RJ Express.

There was a proposal to extend the Manila Metro Rail Transit System, or MRT-3, to Monumento, which would result in both stations being linked and Monumento terminal becoming a transfer point between LRT-1 and MRT-3. Currently, these plans have been shelved in favor of an extension of the LRT-1 Line towards North Avenue over the same routing as the previous MRT-3 proposal.

It is directly linked to SM City Grand Central, which replaced the former Ever Gotesco Grand Central that burned down. The station's east gate and platform are directly connected to the LRT Caloocan Mall.

See also
List of rail transit stations in Metro Manila
Manila Light Rail Transit System

References

Manila Light Rail Transit System stations
Railway stations opened in 1985
Buildings and structures in Caloocan
1985 establishments in the Philippines